Live Phish 10.31.90 is an archival live album release by the American rock band Phish. The show was originally webcast on October 10, 1999. It was also released in MP3 format in 1999 through eMusic, making it the first archival recording released officially online. The show was later made available when Phish launched its LivePhish website and is currently available exclusively through that site. This archival release is also believed to have been the 1st ever commercially download release of a full, live concert by any band.

This was the 1st Phish Halloween show to take place outside Vermont, and although this is a Halloween show, it does not feature Phish donning a "Musical Costume", as they later would do 1994, 1995, 1996, 1998, 2009, 2010, 2013, 2014, 2016, and 2018. The show was part of 5 day tour through Colorado, a state where the band would tour often in the early years  It was an all-ages show on the campus of Colorado College. The tickets for the show indicated “Costume Required”. Keyboardist, Page McConnell's costume consisted of pumpkin-shaped glasses and an orange shirt. Before the second set began, there was a Halloween costume contest on stage during which finalists had to come onstage to jump on the mini-trampolines. The song, You Enjoy Myself, contained a musical quote of Munsters theme from Mike Gordon, and the end contained a vocal jam was based on Night in Tunisia. Tweezer contained Heartbreaker teases from the band.

Track listing

Set One 
 Buried Alive (Anastasio) - 2:39
 Possum (Holdsworth) - 9:37
 The Squirming Coil (Anastasio/Marshall) - 5:59
 The Lizards (Anastasio) - 10:12
 Stash (Anastasio/Marshall) - 8:23
 Bouncing Around the Room (Anastasio/Marshall) - 3:54
 You Enjoy Myself (Anastasio) - 16:27
 The Asse Festival (Anastasio) - 1:49
 My Sweet One (Fishman) - 2:17
 Cavern (Anastasio/Marshall/Herman) - 4:31
 Run Like An Antelope (Anastasio/Pollak) - 9:58

Set Two 
 The Landlady (Anastasio) - 3:45
 Reba (Anastasio) - 10:16
 Runaway Jim (Anastasio/Abrahams) - 6:26
 Foam (Anastasio) - 8:55
 Tweezer (Anastasio/Fishman/Gordon/McConnell) - 10:43
 Fee (Anastasio) - 5:13
 The Oh Kee Pa Ceremony (Anastasio) - 1:43
 Suzy Greenberg (Pollak) - 5:34
 Love You* (Barrett) - 5:44
 Mike's Song (Gordon) - 6:03
 I Am Hydrogen (Anastasio/Marshall/Daubert) 2:39
 Weekapaug Groove (Anastasio/Fishman/Gordon/McConnell) - 6:36

Encore 
 Uncle Pen** (Monroe) - 5:32
 Big Black Furry Creature from Mars (Gordon) 3:52

Personnel
Trey Anastasio – guitars, lead vocals
Page McConnell – piano, organ, backing vocals
Mike Gordon – bass, backing vocals, co-lead vocals on "My Sweet One", lead vocals on "Uncle Pen" and "Big Black Furry Creature from Mars"
Jon Fishman – drums, backing vocals

References

External links 
 Phish.com - Official Site
 LivePhish.com - 10.31.1990
 Phish.net - October 31, 1990

1999 live albums
Live Phish series